Heaberlin is a surname. Notable people with the surname include:

 Bryane Heaberlin (born 1993), American soccer player
 Stanley Heaberlin (1908–1989), American politician

See also
 Haberlin